Rhabdophis is a genus of snakes in the subfamily Natricinae of the family Colubridae. Species in the genus Rhabdophis are generally called keelback snakes, and are found primarily in Southeast Asia.

Toxicity
Rhabdophis is often thought of as completely harmless, but there are several cases of severe envenomation and at least one recorded fatality from the Japanese species. The symptoms have been compared to those of highly venomous African colubrids such as the boomslang. Similar reports exist for other species of the genus, which also make reference to the highly hemorrhagic nature of the venom. There is a supposed antivenom in Japan, but not in other countries.

While the term "poisonous snake" is often incorrectly used for a wide variety of venomous snakes, some species of Rhabdophis are in fact poisonous but not venomous. Keelback snakes have salivary glands that secrete poison they ingest from eating poisonous toads. While both venom and poison are toxins, a venom requires direct delivery, for instance subcutaneously through a snake bite, but can be ingested without harm. A poison can also be absorbed indirectly, e.g., by touch or through the digestive system, or delivered by the fang of a poisonous snake. 
Rhabdophis ingest poisonous toads and the poison is absorbed into their blood stream, but the snake is immune to it. The toad poison now accumulates in their salivary glands which is secreted when they bite. Therefore, they use toad poison as their venom. Although this is harmful to small rodents, they cannot harm humans as the concentration of poison secreted is very low.

Species
These species are recognized as being valid:
Rhabdophis adleri 
Rhabdophis akraios  – Singalang keelback
Rhabdophis angeli  – Angel's keelback
Rhabdophis auriculatus  – white-lined water snake
Rhabdophis barbouri  – Barbour's water snake
Rhabdophis bindi  – Bindee keelback 
Rhabdophis callichroma  – Bavi keelback
Rhabdophis callistus  – Boettger's keelback
Rhabdophis ceylonensis  – Sri Lanka blossom krait, Sri Lanka keelback
Rhabdophis chiwen  – Chiwen keelback
Rhabdophis chrysargoides  – Javanese keelback, Günther's keelback
Rhabdophis chrysargos  – specklebelly keelback
Rhabdophis confusus  
Rhabdophis conspicillatus  – red-bellied keelback
Rhabdophis flaviceps  – orangeneck keelback, orange-lipped keelback, yellow-headed keelback        
Rhabdophis guangdongensis  – Guangdong keelback
Rhabdophis helleri  – Heller’s red-necked keelback
Rhabdophis himalayanus  – orange-collared keelback
Rhabdophis leonardi  – Burmese keelback
Rhabdophis lineatus  – zigzag-lined water snake
Rhabdophis murudensis  – Muruden keelback, Gunung Murud keelback
Rhabdophis nigrocinctus  – black-striped keelback
Rhabdophis nuchalis  – Hubei keelback
Rhabdophis pentasupralabialis 
Rhabdophis plumbicolor  – green keelback, lead keelback
Rhabdophis rhodomelas  – blueneck keelback, blue-necked keelback
Rhabdophis siamensis 
Rhabdophis subminiatus  – red-necked keelback
Rhabdophis swinhonis  – Swinhoe's grass snake
Rhabdophis tigrinus  – tiger grooved-neck keelback, tiger keelback, Japanese grass snake, yamakagashi

Nota bene: A binomial authority in parentheses indicates that the species was originally described in a genus other than Rhabdophis.

References

External links
 Animal Diversity Web list of species of Rhabdophis
 Omne vivum list of species

Further reading
Fitzinger L (1843). Systema Reptilium, Fasciculus Primus, Amblyglossae. Vienna: Braumüller & Seidel. 106 pp. + indices. (Rhabdophis, new genus, p. 27). (in Latin).

 
Reptiles of Asia
Snake genera
Taxa named by Leopold Fitzinger